Arroyo Colorado Estates is a census-designated place (CDP) in Cameron County, in the U.S. state of Texas. The population was 997 at the 2010 census. It is part of the Brownsville–Harlingen Metropolitan Statistical Area.

History
The town was established in the 1980s.

Geography

Demographics
As of the census of 2000, there were 755 people, 177 households, and 167 families residing in the CDP. The population density was 688.9 people per square mile (265.0/km2). There were 200 housing units at an average density of 182.5/sq mi (70.2/km2). The racial makeup of the CDP was 98.15% White, 0.40% African American, and 1.46% from two or more races. Hispanic or Latino of any race were 96.56% of the population.

There were 177 households, out of which 60.5% had children under the age of 18 living with them, 77.4% were married couples living together, 14.7% had a female householder with no husband present, and 5.6% were non-families. 4.5% of all households were made up of individuals, and 2.3% had someone living alone who was 65 years of age or older. The average household size was 4.27 and the average family size was 4.34.

In the CDP, the population was spread out, with 39.6% under the age of 18, 15.1% from 18 to 24, 25.4% from 25 to 44, 14.8% from 45 to 64, and 5.0% who were 65 years of age or older. The median age was 22 years. For every 100 females, there were 110.3 males. For every 100 females age 18 and over, there were 100.0 males.

The median income for a household in the CDP was $22,069, and the median income for a family was $22,284. Males had a median income of $19,423 versus $20,000 for females. The per capita income for the CDP was $5,971. About 28.5% of families and 27.6% of the population were below the poverty line, including 41.0% of those under age 18 and none of those age 65 or over.

Education
The community is served by the Rio Hondo Independent School District.

In addition, South Texas Independent School District operates magnet schools that serve the community.

References

Census-designated places in Cameron County, Texas
Census-designated places in Texas